The following is the complete filmography and stage career of Australian actor, singer, and producer Hugh Jackman. Jackman has appeared in multiple performing venues which are represented as separate chronological categories for each performing venue.

Film

Television

Stage

Music

Albums
Credits adapted from AllMusic:

Musical albums

Soundtrack albums

Charted and certified songs

Video games

Notes

References 

Male actor filmographies
Australian filmographies
Performances